John Fieldhouse (born 28 June 1962) is an English former professional rugby league footballer who played in the 1970s, 1980s and 1990s, and has coached in the 1990s. He played at representative level for Great Britain, and at club level for Wigan St Patricks ARLFC, Warrington (Heritage No. 803), Widnes (Heritage No.)

Playing career

Club career
Fieldhouse transferred from Warrington to Widnes as part of a deal for Andy Gregory, and then transferred from Widnes to St. Helens in return for Harry Pinner. He went to play for Oldham, Halifax and South Wales.

International honours
John Fieldhouse won caps for Great Britain while at Widnes in 1985 against New Zealand (3 matches), and in 1986 against France (2 matches), and Australia, and while at St. Helens against Australia.

Challenge Cup Final appearances
John Fieldhouse played right-, i.e. number 10, in St. Helens' 18–19 defeat by Halifax in the 1987 Challenge Cup Final during the 1986–87 season at Wembley Stadium, London on Saturday 2 May 1987.

County Cup Final appearances
John Fieldhouse played right-, i.e. number 12, in Warrington's 16–0 victory over St. Helens in the 1982 Lancashire County Cup Final during the 1982–83 season at Central Park, Wigan on Saturday 23 October 1982, and played right-, i.e. number 10, in Oldham's 16–24 defeat by Warrington in the 1989 Lancashire County Cup Final during the 1989–90 season at Knowsley Road, St. Helens on Saturday 14 October 1989.

Genealogical information

References

External links
!Great Britain Statistics at englandrl.co.uk (statistics currently missing due to not having appeared for both Great Britain, and England)
Profile at saints.org.uk
(archived by web.archive.org) Statistics at rugby.widnes.tv
(archived by web.archive.org) Statistics at orl-heritagetrust.org.uk
(archived by web.archive.org) Statistics at wolvesplayers.thisiswarrington.co.uk

1962 births
Living people
English rugby league coaches
English rugby league players
Great Britain national rugby league team players
Halifax R.L.F.C. players
Lancashire rugby league team players
Oldham R.L.F.C. coaches
Oldham R.L.F.C. players
Rugby league hookers
Rugby league players from Wigan
Rugby league props
Rugby league second-rows
South Wales RLFC (1995) players
St Helens R.F.C. players
Warrington Wolves players
Widnes Vikings players
Wigan St Patricks players